Robert Moller Gilbreth (July 4, 1920 – July 27, 2007) was an American educator, businessman, and politician.

Gilbreth was born in Nantucket, Massachusetts. His parents were Frank Bunker Gilbreth Sr. and Lillian Moller Gilbreth. He went to the Montclair, New Jersey public schools. He received his bachelor's degree from the University of North Carolina in 1943 and his master's degree in education from Plymouth State University. Gilbreth also went to the University of Massachusetts for graduate studies. He taught school in Nantucket, Massachusetts and owned the Anchor Inn with his wife on Nantucket Island. Gilbreth then taught school and served as a principal for the Franklin, New Hampshire Junior and Senior High Schools.

Gilbreth served as the Franklin Telegram newspaper part-time reporter. In 1984, Gilbreth served in the New Hampshire Constitutional Convention of 1984. He also served on the Franklin School Board from 1980 to 1987. From 1985 to 1994, Gilbreth served in the New Hampshire House of Representatives. In 1985, Gilbreth opposed a bill in the legislature that human life begins at conception. Gilbreth did not agree with women who wanted abortions. However, he felt counseling was needed. In 2007, Gilbreth died from cancer at the Franklin Regional Hospital in Franklin, New Hampshire.

Notes

External links
 
 , comprehensive family and professional history.

1920 births
2007 deaths
People from Nantucket, Massachusetts
People from Franklin, New Hampshire
University of Massachusetts alumni
University of North Carolina alumni
Plymouth State University alumni
Businesspeople from Massachusetts
Educators from Massachusetts
Educators from New Hampshire
Journalists from New Hampshire
School board members in New Hampshire
Members of the New Hampshire House of Representatives
Deaths from cancer in New Hampshire
20th-century American politicians
20th-century American businesspeople
20th-century American journalists
American male journalists